The 1980 World Challenge Cup sponsored by State Express was the second team snooker tournament. The format mostly remained the same as the previous championship although the group 2nd place players would now reach a semi-final stage with the group winners. It took place between 18 and 26 October 1980 and the tournament had now moved to the New London Theatre which had hosted the Masters championship between 1976 and 1978.

Terry Griffiths made the highest break of the tournament, 109.
 


Main draw
Teams and results are shown below.

Teams

Group A

Group B

Semi-finals

Final

References

World Cup (snooker)
1980 in snooker